Lee Byung-yoon (Hangul: 이병윤; born June 15, 1993), better known by his stage name BewhY (Hangul: 비와이), is a South Korean rapper and member of '$exy $treet & Yello Music crew'. Initially he chose 'BY' as a stage name, but changed it to 'BewhY' to give a meaning to the name. The name was given by rapper C Jamm, an old friend from high school.

Bewhy won first place on Show Me the Money 5 in 2016, and childhood friend C Jamm came in second on the show. Bewhy is known for being a devout Christian.

Personal life 
In October 2020, Bewhy married his non-celebrity partner who he had been dating for 8 years. On January 13, 2023, his wife gave birth to their first child, a daughter.

Bewhy is scheduled to enlist in the military on August 23, 2021, where he will serve as a Marine Corps police officer.And BewhY will be discharged from military service as a Marine Corps police officer on April 22, 2023.

Discography

Studio albums

Extended plays

Mixtapes

Singles

Filmography

Television series

Variety shows

Awards and nominations

References

External links

1993 births
Living people
South Korean Christians
South Korean male rappers
South Korean hip hop singers
21st-century South Korean male singers
Musicians from Incheon
Melon Music Award winners
Show Me the Money (South Korean TV series) contestants